Ben Shires is a British television presenter and comedian, currently working on TV channels CBBC and Dave. He hosts the Guinness World Records-themed children's show Officially Amazing, and is also a radio presenter on Heart Yorkshire.

Career 
Shires initially aspired to be a lawyer. He was in a contest to become a new presenter for Channel 4's scheduling slot T4, but came up short. In 2013, he was employed by the BBC, and Officially Amazing began airing and has produced seven series since then. Shires presents alongside Haruka Kuroda and Al Jackson.

In 2015, Shires started presenting Match of the Day Kickabout, a spin-off of MOTD, designed for children. It was previously presented by Ore Oduba and Radzi Chinyanganya.

On 4 January 2016, he came joint second in Celebrity Mastermind, with his specialist subject being Leeds United.

In 2016, Shires hosted World of Weird for Channel 4 and was in a Christmas celebrity special of Children quiz show Top Class.

In 2017, Shires was a contestant on Remotely Funny. He has written columns for The Huffington Post.

In 2020, during the COVID-19 pandemic, Shires hosted some of the BBC Bitesize Daily home-schooling shows.

Television credits

References

External links

British television presenters
Living people
Place of birth missing (living people)
1985 births